Coleophora argentinae is a moth of the family Coleophoridae.

References

argentinae
Moths described in 1999